Tasata is a genus of South American anyphaenid sac spiders first described by Eugène Simon in 1903.

Species
 it contains fifteen species, most from Brazil:
Tasata centralis Ramírez, 2003 – Argentina
Tasata frenata (Mello-Leitão, 1947) – Brazil
Tasata fuscotaeniata (Keyserling, 1891) – Brazil
Tasata nova (Mello-Leitão, 1922) – Brazil
Tasata parcepunctata Simon, 1903 – Argentina, Uruguay
Tasata punctata (Keyserling, 1891) – Brazil
Tasata quinquenotata (Simon, 1897) – Brazil
Tasata reticulata (Mello-Leitão, 1943) – Brazil
Tasata taim Ramírez, 2003 – Brazil
Tasata taperae (Mello-Leitão, 1929) – Brazil
Tasata tigris Mello-Leitão, 1941 – Brazil
Tasata tripunctata (Mello-Leitão, 1941) – Brazil
Tasata tullgreni Roewer, 1951 – Bolivia
Tasata unipunctata (Simon, 1897) – Brazil
Tasata variolosa Mello-Leitão, 1943 – Brazil, Uruguay, Argentina

References

Anyphaenidae
Araneomorphae genera
Spiders of South America
Taxa named by Eugène Simon